Saint Alkmund's Church is a parish church in the Church of England in Duffield, Derbyshire.

History

It dates back to the first millennium, and is situated on the banks of the River Derwent to the south of Duffield, Derbyshire, England. It is the parish church of Duffield, and is associated with the nearby church of St Paul's in Little Eaton. In times past, the Parish of Duffield was much larger than it is now, covering the area known as Duffield Frith. The church's distance from the centre of the village is thought be because it was next to Duffield Bridge, which was used by pilgrims and other travellers.

The church is Grade I listed. The current building dates from the 14th century, but was restored in 1847 by James Piers St Aubyn and in 1896–97 by John Oldrid Scott. Its weathercock was installed in 1719 by ironsmith Robert Bakewell.

The church is in a joint ecclesiastical parish with St Paul's Church, Little Eaton, which was formerly part of Duffield Frith.

Bells
During the restoration of 1887, the peal of eight bells was augmented to ten by a gift from Sir Arthur Heywood, 3rd Baronet. St Alkmund's is one of only a few churches outside the larger centres so endowed.

Organ

The church has a pipe organ by Cousans dating from 1972. A specification of the organ can be found on the National Pipe Organ Register.

See also
Grade I listed churches in Derbyshire
Grade I listed buildings in Derbyshire
Listed buildings in Duffield, Derbyshire

References

External links 
 

Church of England church buildings in Derbyshire
Grade I listed churches in Derbyshire